The United States men's national beach soccer team represents the United States in international beach soccer competitions and is controlled by the USSF, the governing body for soccer in the United States.

History

Early years
The sport of beach soccer originated in Brazil, where locals played soccer on the beaches for recreation. In 1992, the United States created official rules and a national team for the South American sport, which led other countries to do the same. Then in 1993, the United States held the first ever professional beach soccer event, which included national teams from Brazil, Argentina, and Italy. A year later in 1994, the U.S. team competed in the first ever Beach Soccer World Championship tournament in Brazil. The U.S. team competed in World Championships again in 1995 and 1997.

FIFA Beach Soccer World Cup era
The sport of beach soccer, and the United States national beach soccer team, became a recognized part of FIFA – the main international governing body of soccer – in 2005, in which CONCACAF – the Confederation of North & Central America and Caribbean Association Football – became the officiating body for qualifying tournaments. The U.S. national beach soccer team went on to compete in FIFA Beach Soccer World Cup tournaments from 2005 through 2013 against some of the 98 total national teams from all around the world.

In 2005, the U.S. team made it to the World Cup in Brazil. In the group stages, they were unable to win either of their games, resulting in them not making it through to the play-offs.

In 2006, the men's national team won the CONCACAF Beach Soccer Championship and qualified for the FIFA World Cup, which was held in Brazil. Due to them only winning one game in the group stages, they did not qualify for the play-offs.

In 2007, the team made it to the FIFA World Cup in Brazil again. They ended up losing in the group stages and were unable to make it through to the play-offs.

In 2008, 2009, and 2010, the U.S. team fell in the semifinals of the CONCACAF Beach Soccer Championships and did not qualify for the World Cup. The FIFA Beach Soccer World Cup changed to being held every other year, meaning the next opportunity for the U.S. to qualify would be in 2013.

In 2013, the men's national beach soccer team won the CONCACAF Beach Soccer Championship and qualified for the World Cup which was held in Tahiti. They did not make it through the group stages and were out before the play-offs.

Anthony Chimienti is the U.S. all-time leading goal scorer in World Cup play with 9 goals, participating in 3 World Cups.

At the 2015 CONCACAF Beach Soccer Championship, the U.S. lost in the semifinals and did not qualify for the World Cup. In 2017, they lost in the quarterfinals and once again did not qualify for the World Cup.

At the 2019 CONCACAF Beach Soccer Championship, the U.S. lost in the finals, but their 2nd-place finish qualified them for the 2019 FIFA Beach Soccer World Cup.

Results and fixtures

The following is a list of match results in the last 12 months, as well as any future matches that have been scheduled.

Legend

2021

Coaching staff

Coaching staff

Players

Current squad
The following 14 players were named to the roster for the 2021 FIFA Beach Soccer World Cup.

Competitive record

FIFA Beach Soccer World Cup

CONCACAF Beach Soccer Championship

References

External links
United States at FIFA
United States at USSF
United States at BSWW
 United States at Beach Soccer Russia

North American national beach soccer teams
United States Soccer Federation
1992 establishments in the United States
Association football clubs established in 1992
Beach soccer in the United States
B